Ken Yager (born January 5, 1947) is a Republican politician who is currently serving as a State Senator in Tennessee, for District 12. Yager was first elected to this position in 2008 and represents the people in the counties of District 12, which are Campbell, Clay, Fentress, Macon, Morgan, Overton, Pickett, Roane, and Scott.

Early life and education 
Yager attended the University of Tennessee at Martin in 1969 he earned his Bachelor of Arts degree in liberal arts and history. In 1972 he earned his master's degree in Education from the University of Tennessee at Martin. He earned his Juris Doctor in law from the University of Memphis in 1977. Yager worked as a cashier and a janitor while attending school.

Yager is married to the former Malinda Raby of Oliver Springs. They have been married for more than 33 years and have two children, Bonnie-Marie and Will. Yager and his wife currently reside in Kingston and attend the First Baptist Church in Kingston, Tennessee.

Career

Early career 
Yager's professional career began as a teacher in the Roane County public school system. Yager served as County Attorney from 1978 to 1982, before being elected County Executive in 1982. He served as the County Executive until 2006. Mr. Yager is an assistant professor of law at Roane State Community College. In 2008 Yager beat Becky Ruppe and Christopher Fenner to become the Tennessee State Senator for district 12, he currently still holds this position.

Political career 
Yager was elected to County Executive in 1986, during which time the county created a budget surplus without increasing taxes and its credit rating improved from A− to A. Yager's administration is noted as having supported the local school system and county road network as well as emergency services. New jobs were created via a new industrial park and consolidation of the local Chamber, Tourism and Industrial Board offices, an animal shelter, new health department, and a new interstate exchange. Yager assisted in securing grants for Roane County that totaled in the millions of dollars. Yager continued in this position until he was elected to the Senate in 2006.

While a freshman Senator Yager was appointed Vice-Chairman of the Senate Environment, Conservation and Tourism Committee. He was then elected by his peers to be on the powerful Joint Fiscal Review Committee, which serves as a watchdog over the state's financial affairs. He also serves on the Senate Transportation Committee and the Senate State and Local Government Committee, where he advises on intergovernmental relations and the need for road improvements in Tennessee's rural communities.

Community involvement 
Yager has served in various roles in the community. He has been the president of a local parent teacher organization, a Boy Scout Committee member, school volunteer, and serves on many non profit boards. Yager is also a member of the National Rifle Association.

Committee assignments 
Yager has served on multiple committees throughout his political career. He is either a current member or has previously been a member of the following legislative and non legislative committees.

Legislative 

 Energy, Agriculture and Natural Resources
 Finance, Ways and Means
 Joint Committee on Fiscal Review
 Joint Fiscal Review
 Select Committee on Ethics
 State and Local Government

Non-legislative 

 Commerce and Labor Committee, Tennessee State Senate
 Judiciary Committee, Tennessee State Senate
 State and Local Government Committee, Tennessee State Senate
Tennessee Advisory Commission on Intergovernmental Relations
 Transportation and Safety Committee, Tennessee State Senate

Awards and honors 
Honors won by Yager include:

 2012 Legislator of the Year, Tennessee Community Organizations
 2012 Legislator of the Year, County Official Association of Tennessee
 2011 Legislator of the Year, East Tennessee Development District
 2011 Check and Balance Award, Tennessee County Services Association
 2009 Legislator of the Year, Tennessee Association of Community Action Agencies
 2010 Hall of Fame Award, The Bridge at Rockwood, Tenn.
 2006 Distinguished Service Award, Roane County Chamber of Commerce
 2013 Republican of the Year Award, Roane County Republican Party
 2013 Legislator of the Year Award, Greater Nashville Regional Council
 2013 Legislator of the Year Award, East TN Development District
 2013, Legislator of the Year Award, Southeast TN Development District
 2014 Open Government Award, The Tennessee Press Association
 2014 Legislator of the Year Award, TN 911
 2014 Good Scout Award, Great Smoky Mountains Council, Boy Scouts of America
 2014 Appreciation Award, ETPA- TAPP
 2015 Appreciation Award, Tennessee Development District Association
 2015 Outstanding Service Award, Scott County Chamber of Commerce

References

External links 

 
 Tennessee State Legislature

Republican Party Tennessee state senators
Heads of county government in Tennessee
Living people
1947 births
21st-century American politicians
People from Kingston, Tennessee